Pleopodal lungs are an anatomical feature of terrestrial isopods and a component of their respiratory system. They are ancestrally derived from pleopodal gills, and they facilitate gas exchange on land. They perform a similar function as spiracles do in insects.

Pleopodal lungs are identifiable on woodlice as white patches on the lower 5 segments (the pleon) on the ventral side (underside). The number of pleopodal lungs vary by species – they may have up to five pairs, or only two pairs as in Porcellio laevis; a minority of species lack pleopodal lungs entirely.

References
 

Arthropod anatomy